Joe Joseph (born October 20, 1985) is a former American football defensive end. He was signed by the Tennessee Titans as an undrafted free agent in 2010. He played college football at University of Miami.

Joseph has also been a member of the New York Giants and Washington Redskins.

Professional career

Tennessee Titans
After going undrafted in the 2010 NFL Draft, Joseph signed with the Tennessee Titans as an undrafted free agent on April 25, 2010. He was cut on September 4, 2010.

New York Giants
The New York Giants signed Joseph to their practice squad on November 30, 2010. He was released on December 14.

Washington Redskins
Joseph was signed to the Washington Redskins practice squad on December 15, 2010. He was promoted to the active roster on December 25, and played in his first NFL game on December 26, against the Jacksonville Jaguars. He was waived on August 6, 2011.

References

External links
Washington Redskins bio 
Miami Hurricanes bio
ESPN.com bio

1985 births
Living people
Sportspeople from Florida
Players of American football from Florida
American football defensive tackles
Miami Hurricanes football players
Tennessee Titans players
New York Giants players
Washington Redskins players